The Reynard 853 is an open-wheel Formula 3 race car, designed, developed, and built by Reynard in 1985.

References

Open wheel racing cars
Formula Three cars
Reynard Motorsport vehicles